The 2010–11 LNB Pro A season was the 89th season of the French Basketball Championship and the 24th season since inception of the Ligue Nationale de Basketball (LNB). The regular season started on October 9, 2010 and ended on May 10, 2011. The play-offs were held from May 17, 2011 till June 11, 2011.
SLUC Nancy became the 2010–11 Pro A champions and gained its second French League title after beating defending champion Cholet Basket in the single-game Final, with a score of 74-76.

Promotion and relegation 
 At the beginning of the 2010-11 season
Teams promoted from 2009–10 Pro B (French 2nd division)
 Pau-Lacq-Orthez
 Limoges

Teams relegated to 2010-11 Pro B
 Dijon
 Rouen

 At the end of the 2010-11 season
 2010-11 Pro A Champion: Nancy

Teams promoted from 2010-11 Pro B
 Nanterre
 Dijon

Teams relegated to 2011–12 Pro B
 Vichy
 Limoges

Team Arenas

Team standings

Season Team leader(s)

Playoffs

Stats Leaders

Awards

Regular Season MVPs 
 "Foreign" MVP:  Sammy Mejia (Cholet)
 "French" MVP:  Mickaël Gelabale (Lyon-Villeurbanne)

Finals MVP 
  John Linehan (Nancy)

Best Coach 
  –  Erman Kunter (Cholet)

Most Improved Player 
  Evan Fournier (Poitiers)

Best Defensive Player 
  John Linehan (Nancy)

Rising Star Award 
  Evan Fournier (Poitiers)

Player of the month

References

External links
  LNB website

LNB Pro A seasons
French
basketball
basketball